The Tripartite Intervention or  was a diplomatic intervention by Russia, Germany, and France on 23 April 1895 over the harsh terms of the Treaty of Shimonoseki imposed by Japan on the Qing dynasty of China that ended the First Sino-Japanese War. The goal was to stop Japanese expansion in China. The Japanese reaction against the Triple Intervention was one of the causes of the subsequent Russo-Japanese War.

Treaty of Shimonoseki
Per the terms of the Treaty of Shimonoseki, Japan was awarded the Liaodong Peninsula including the harbor city of Port Arthur, which it had conquered from China. Immediately after the terms of the treaty became public, Russia—with its own designs and sphere of influence in China—expressed concern about Japanese acquisition of the Liaodong Peninsula and the possible impact of the terms of the treaty on the stability of China. Russia persuaded France and Germany to apply diplomatic pressure on Japan for return of the territory to China in exchange for a larger indemnity.

The European powers
Russia had the most to gain out of the Triple Intervention. In the preceding years, Russia had been slowly increasing its influence in the Far East. The construction of the Trans-Siberian Railway and the acquisition of a warm-water port would enable Russia to consolidate its presence in the region and further expand into Asia and the Pacific. Russia had not expected that Japan would be victorious against China. Port Arthur falling into Japanese hands would undermine its own desperate need for a warm-water port in the East.

France was obligated to join Russia under the 1892 treaty. Although French bankers did have financial interests in Russia (especially railroads), France had no territorial ambitions in Manchuria, since its sphere of influence was in southern China (see Sino-French War). The French actually had cordial relations with the Japanese: French military advisors had been sent to train the Imperial Japanese Army and a number of Japanese ships had been built in French shipyards. However, France did not wish to be diplomatically isolated, as it had been previously, especially given the growing power of Germany.

Germany had two reasons to support Russia: firstly, its desire to draw Russia's attention to the east and away from itself and secondly, to enlist Russia's support in establishing German territorial concessions in China. Germany hoped that support for Russia would encourage Russia, in turn, to support Germany's colonial ambitions, which were especially vexed since Germany had only recently formed itself into a unified nation and had arrived late in the colonial "game."

Conclusion

The Japanese government reluctantly acceded to the intervention, as British and American diplomatic intercession was not forthcoming, and Japan was in no position to militarily resist three major European powers simultaneously. The three powers had 38 warships with a displacement of 95,000 tons already deployed in East Asia, whereas the Imperial Japanese Navy had only 31 warships in total with a displacement of 57,000 tons.  
After futile diplomatic efforts to enlist the support of the United States and Great Britain, on 5 May 1895, Prime Minister Itō Hirobumi announced the withdrawal of Japanese forces from the Liaodong Peninsula in exchange for an additional indemnity of 30 million kuping taels (450 million yen). The last Japanese troops departed in December.

Much to Japan's astonishment and consternation, Russia moved almost immediately to occupy the entire Liaodong Peninsula and especially to fortify Port Arthur. Germany secured control over concessions in Shandong Province, and France, and even Great Britain took advantage of the weakened China to seize port cities on various pretexts and to expand their spheres of influence.

Japan's government felt it had been cheated of its deserved spoils of war by this intervention. This humiliation at the hands of the European powers helped lead to the  movement. Figuratively translated as "Persevering through Hardship (for the sake of revenge)", the saying is derived from the Chinese chengyu of wòxīnchángdǎn, literally meaning "sleeping on sticks and tasting gall", that alludes to the perseverance of King Goujian of Yue (reigned 496–465 BC) in the War between Wu and Yue. For modern Japan, this ideology meant an increase in heavy industry and strength of the armed forces, especially the navy, at the expense of individual wants and needs.

The Triple Intervention had a profound effect on Japanese foreign relations, as Japanese diplomacy sought to avoid a reconstitution of a combination of European Powers against Japan. It led directly to the Anglo-Japanese Alliance of 1902 which was explicitly intended to shield Japan from interference from other European Great Powers, and from Russia in particular.

Notes

References
 
  
 

Foreign intervention
Kwantung Leased Territory
History of Dalian
1895 in Japan
1895 in China
1895 in the Russian Empire
1895 in Germany
1895 in France
History of the foreign relations of France
Foreign relations of the German Empire
Foreign relations of the Empire of Japan
Foreign relations of the Qing dynasty
China–Russian Empire relations
First Sino-Japanese War
Russo-Japanese War
China–France relations
China–Germany relations
France–Germany relations
France–Japan relations
France–Russia relations
Germany–Japan relations
Germany–Russia relations